Smilax herbacea, the smooth carrionflower or smooth herbaceous greenbrier, is a plant in the catbriar family.  It is native to eastern Canada (Quebec, Ontario, New Brunswick) and the eastern United States (as far south as Georgia and Alabama). Its preferred natural habitat is rich forests, and riparian thicket and meadows.

Description
Smilax herbacea is a vine with alternate, simple leaves, on climbing stems. The flowers are green, borne in spring. The plant at first looks like asparagus when it first sprouts out of the ground. The plant can grow over 8 feet tall without support, but will eventually fall over unless it successfully finds external support.

Uses

Food 
The species can be used to prepare food in the same fashion as Smilax bona-nox and Smilax rotundifolia.

Ethnobotany
In traditional Ainu medicine, applications of the softened leaves were used for healing eye infections, skin eruptions, and wounds.

References

Smilacaceae
Flora of North America
Plants described in 1753
Taxa named by Carl Linnaeus